The Institute may refer to:

 Georgia Institute of Technology, US
 The Institute (company), also known as "The Institute for the Development of Enhanced Perceptual Awareness", a film and television production/distribution studio in Hollywood
 The Institute (video game), a 1983 graphic adventure game
 The Institute (2013 film), a documentary film about an alternate reality game called "The Jejune Institute" set in San Francisco
 The Institute (2017 film), a horror-thriller film directed by James Franco
 The Institute (2022 film), a thriller film starring Ignacyo Matynia
 The Institute (Cain novel), a 1976 novel by James M. Cain
 The Institute (King novel), a 2019 novel by Stephen King
 The Institute (album), by King Diamond

See also

 
 
 Institute (disambiguation)
 Institution (disambiguation)